Antsiferovo is a rural locality (a village) in Sosnovskoye Rural Settlement, Vologodsky District, Vologda Oblast, Russia. The population was 23 as of 2002.

Geography 
The distance to Vologda is 24.5 km, to Sosnovka is 5 km. Maloye Chertishchevo, Yurkino, Babtsyno, Savkino, Goluzino are the nearest rural localities.

References 

Rural localities in Vologodsky District